Vince Villanucci is a former nose tackle in the National Football League.

Biography
Villanucci was born Vincent Anthony Villanucci on May 30, 1964 in Lorain, Ohio.

Career
Villanucci played with the Green Bay Packers during the 1987 NFL season. He played at the collegiate level at Bowling Green State University.

See also
List of Green Bay Packers players

References

Sportspeople from Lorain, Ohio
Green Bay Packers players
American football defensive tackles
Bowling Green State University alumni
Bowling Green Falcons football players
1964 births
Living people